Firbank is a village and civil parish in the South Lakeland district of the English county of Cumbria.  It has a population of 97. As Firbank had a population of less than 100 at the 2011 Census, details are included in the parish of Killington.  In 1652, George Fox preached to about 1,000 people at Fox's Pulpit, at one of the meetings which brought about the Quaker movement.

The poet Catherine Grace Godwin is buried at St John the Evangelist Church.

See also

Listed buildings in Firbank

References

External links
 Cumbria County History Trust: Firbank (nb: provisional research only – see Talk page)

Villages in Cumbria
Civil parishes in Cumbria